Vikash Ranjan (born 15 February 1994) is an Indian cricketer. He made his List A debut for Bihar in the 2018–19 Vijay Hazare Trophy on 19 September 2018. He made his first-class debut for Bihar in the 2018–19 Ranji Trophy on 1 November 2018. He made his Twenty20 debut on 11 January 2021, for Bihar in the 2020–21 Syed Mushtaq Ali Trophy.

References

External links
 

1993 births
Living people
Indian cricketers
Bihar cricketers
People from Muzaffarpur